Charlie McKinley (26 October 1903 – 27 February 1990) was an Australian rules footballer who played with Fitzroy in the Victorian Football League (VFL).

Notes

External links 
		

1903 births
1990 deaths
Australian rules footballers from Victoria (Australia)
Fitzroy Football Club players